The Peterhead Prison Riot was a prison riot that occurred on 28 September 1987 at HMP Peterhead, in Peterhead.

Background 
HMP Peterhead was a convict prison in Peterhead, Scotland operated from 1888 to 2013. It was closed in favour of the neighbouring super prison HMP & YOI Grampian. It had a capacity of 152, but at one point in 1911 it was home to 455 prisoners. Among inmates, the prison was known as "Hate Factory" or "Scottish Alcatraz".

Aftermath 
The SPS located all those who had been involved in riots and hostage-taking at Peterhead in an attempt to stabilise the entire prison estate. The 60 inmates involved were initially held in "lockdown" under prison rule 36 which meant the governor had to visit each one every day. The repairs cost £55 million (equivalent to £132,989,789 in 2022).

References 

 
 
 
 
 

1987 in Scotland
Prison uprisings
Prison-related crime
1987 riots
1980s in Scotland
Hostage taking in Europe